John Dorrance III (born 1943/1944) is an American-born Irish billionaire businessman and Campbell's Soup heir. He is also known as "Ippy" Dorrance.

Early life
He is the son of John T. "Jack" Dorrance Jr. (1919–1989), and grandson of John Thompson Dorrance.

Career
As of September 2019, Forbes estimated his net worth at US$2.6 billion.

Personal life
For 15 years he lived on a ranch in Wyoming, before moving to Ireland. The Philadelphia Inquirer reported that, "In Ireland, he can pay half the 30 percent U.S. tax rate on dividends, and when he dies, his estate will be taxed at 35 percent, rather than 55 percent in the United States."

He is married with two children and lives in Dublin.

References

1944 births
Living people
Campbell Soup Company people
Irish billionaires
Irish businesspeople
Dorrance family
People who renounced United States citizenship
American emigrants to Ireland